Thomas Robert Bard (December 8, 1841March 5, 1915) was an American political leader in California who assisted in the organization of Ventura County and represented the state in the United States Senate from 1900 to 1905 as a Republican. He is known as the "Father of Port Hueneme" for his efforts in building and expanding the city, as well as the first and only deep water port in the area.  He is one of the founders of the UNOCAL company.

Early life
Born in Chambersburg, Franklin County, Pennsylvania, on December 8, 1841, Bard attended the common schools, and graduated from the Chambersburg Academy in 1858. He studied law in school, and before his graduation, he secured a job with the Pennsylvania Railroad Company. Later, he became an assistant to the superintendent of the Cumberland Valley Railroad. Other business ventures included the grain business in Hagerstown, Maryland. During the early part of the Civil War, Bard served as a volunteer Union scout during the invasions of Maryland and Pennsylvania by the Confederates.

In 1865, Bard arrived in Ventura County, California, to develop his uncle Thomas A. Scott's properties in Ojai.  In 1867, Bard would become the first person in California to produce oil from a drilled well.

Political career

Thomas R. Bard moved to Ventura County, California, in 1864 and served as a member of the board of supervisors of Santa Barbara County from 1868 to 1873. In 1871, he was appointed as a commissioner to organize Ventura County. During this time, he purchased and subdivided Rancho El Rio de Santa Clara o la Colonia and laid out the plans for Port Hueneme, California, the future site of his Berylwood estate.

Bard was the California delegate to the 1884 Republican National Convention, and later served as the director of the California state board of agriculture from 1886 to 1887. In 1887, Bard became a founding board member of Occidental College. He was elected as a Republican to the United States Senate to fill a vacancy in the term that began on March 4, 1899. He served from February 7, 1900, to March 3, 1905. Bard was unsuccessful in his 1904 reelection bid. During his term Bard served as the chairman of the Committee of Fisheries (for the Fifty-seventh Congress) and served on the Committee on irrigation (for the Fifty-eighth Congress). One of Thomas R. Bard's notable acts during his time in office was to appoint George S. Patton to West Point.

Family and later life

Thomas R. Bard became a successful business man, and held profitable interests in several oil companies. Thomas R. Bard and his brother, Dr. Cephas Little Bard, established the Elizabeth Bard Memorial Hospital in Ventura as a memorial to their mother. His son, Archibald Philip Bard, became a noted physiologist and the dean of Johns Hopkins Medical School.

He died at his Berylwood home in Port Hueneme, California, on March 5, 1915, and was interred in the family cemetery on his estate. His remains were moved to Ivy Lawn Cemetery in Ventura, California, by the military.

See also

 Bardsdale, California
 Bard, California
 R. G. Surdam

References

Further reading
Biographical Directory of the United States Congress
Hutchinson, William Henry. Oil, Land, and Politics: The California Career of Thomas R. Bard. 2 vols. Norman: University of Oklahoma Press, 1965.
Lawrence Kestenbaum. The Political Graveyard

External links
 

1841 births
1915 deaths
People from Chambersburg, Pennsylvania
American people of Scotch-Irish descent
Republican Party United States senators from California
California Republicans
County supervisors in California
American businesspeople in the oil industry
Businesspeople from California
Founders of the petroleum industry
Union Oil Company of California
19th-century American politicians
People from Port Hueneme, California
People of Pennsylvania in the American Civil War
Union Army soldiers
Burials in Ventura County, California
Burials at Ivy Lawn Cemetery